The Complete Idiot (Spanish: La tonta del bote) is a 1970 Spanish comedy film directed by Juan de Orduña and starring Lina Morgan, Arturo Fernández and Paca Gabaldón. It is a remake of the 1939 film of the same title.

Cast
  Lina Morgan as Susana  
 Arturo Fernández as Felipe  
 Paca Gabaldón as Asunta 
 José Sacristán as Narciso  
 Marisol Ayuso as Trini  
 Antonio Durán a s Cipriano  
 Luis Varela as Lorito 
 Tony Soler as Numancia  
 Antonio Casal as Don Ambrosio 
 Tomás Blanco as Basilio  
 Roberto Rey 
 David Areu
 Félix Dafauce 
 María Asquerino as Engracia  
 Manena Algora 
 Carmen Martínez Sierra as Clienta de la prenderia 1  
 José García Calderón  
 Tania Ballester 
 María Isbert as Clienta de la prenderia 2 
 Josefina Villalta 
 Juan Amigo 
 Sansona Siglo XX as Clienta de la corseteria  
 Manuel Guitián 
 Luis Frutos

References

Bibliography 
 Bentley, Bernard. A Companion to Spanish Cinema. Boydell & Brewer 2008.

External links 
 

1970 comedy films
Spanish comedy films
1970 films
1970s Spanish-language films
Films directed by Juan de Orduña
Remakes of Spanish films
Films with screenplays by Rafael J. Salvia
1970s Spanish films